Georgia State Route 10 Loop may refer to:

 Georgia State Route 10 Loop (Athens), loop route of State Route 10 in the Athens, Georgia metropolitan area
 Georgia State Route 10 Loop (Washington), former loop route of State Route 10 mostly in Washington, Georgia

010 Loop